Crepidula moulinsii is a species of sea snail, a marine gastropod mollusk in the family Calyptraeidae, the slipper snails or slipper limpets, cup-and-saucer snails, and Chinese pant snails.

Description

Distribution
This species occurs in the North Atlantic Ocean and in the Mediterranean Sea.

References

 Michaud A. L. G. (1829). Description de plusieurs espèces nouvelles de coquilles vivantes. Bulletin d'Histoire Naturelle de la Société Linnéenne de Bordeaux 3: 260-276, 1 pl

External links
 Hoagland, K.E. 1977. Systematic review of fossil and recent Crepidula and discussion of the evolution of the Calyptraeidae. Malacologia, 16(2): 353-420

Calyptraeidae
Gastropods described in 1829